Djakout Mizik (now Djakout #1) is a Haitian compas band based in Carrefour, Haiti, Djakout Mizik is notable for their slow jazzy style and have produced songs such as Septieme Ciel, Naje Pou Soti, and Biznis Pam.

On New Year's Eve 2007, they performed with Wyclef Jean on MTV. This was their first appearance on an American network television. In February 2008, they were crowned the best carnival band in Haiti for their energetic performance of Kalòt Marasa (two slaps). In 2010, Djakout Mizik divided into two distinct bands; one retained the original name "Djakout Mizik", with the second band taking the name "Djakout #1".

Studio albums
Defi Leve
Jistis
Live Biznis pa m'''ManniguetaLove SongsLive Mechan MechanLa FamiliaSeptieme Ciel''

Discography

References

Haitian musical groups